Maximilian Moser (born 21 February 1997) is an Austrian footballer currently playing for the Duke University Blue Devils.

External links

1997 births
Living people
Austrian footballers
SC Austria Lustenau players
Association football defenders